GSN Live is an American live interactive show on Game Show Network that premiered on February 25, 2008, at noon ET and officially ended its 3-year run on July 29, 2011. The last "live" edition aired May 13, 2011. It lasted three hours in between regular GSN programming and featured games that viewers played to win prizes over the phone, highlights from Classic game shows, interviews, behind-the-scenes views of GSN, and celebrity appearances. It was formerly hosted in two shifts. The first shift, from Noon to 3:00 p.m. ET was hosted by Heidi Bohay (with Alfonso Ribeiro until August 11, 2009). Fred Roggin hosted the 3:00 p.m. to 6:00 p.m. ET segment. Kelly Packard co-hosted from September 15  to November 28, 2008, and Roggin co-hosted the 3 hours with rotating guest hosts until Debra Skelton was chosen to replace Packard on May 26, 2009, the same day the current set was introduced and when it was hosted by three people. Fred Roggin left GSN Live on July 2, 2009, Alfonso Ribeiro left GSN Live on August 11, 2009, Debra Skelton left GSN Live in January 2010, and Heidi Bohay left the show in April 2010, making Bob Guiney currently the sole host. The show was executive produced by Burt Dubrow until March 6, 2009, and is currently produced by John Berkson, Gary Green, and Laura Slobin. The sound mixer was Mike Dooley. Budget cuts implemented by the new GSN executive regime are causing the almost weekly dismissals of production staff members from the show. Due to these cuts the show was cut from six hours to three hours and now runs from 3:00 p.m. to 6:00 p.m. ET. The staff was cut by 7 effective December 30, 2009, leaving the future of the show in question.

The show has run for three hours daily, Noon to 3:00 p.m. ET from its debut until September 12, 2008, and since October 12, 2009, from 3:00 p.m. to 6:00 p.m. ET. The hosts for the three-hour show were Fred Roggin and Heidi Bohay. On September 15, 2008, it expanded to six hours daily and ran from Noon to 6:00 p.m. ET until October 9, 2009. GSN Live was on hiatus for the week of May 18, 2009, to May 25, 2009, to transition to a new set, and returned on May 26, 2009.

Format
The interactive games on GSN Live are interspersed during regular programming for a short time when commercials would normally run. Games are introduced at the beginning of an hour and played by a caller near the end of the hour. There is only one player for each game. Entries can be made on the internet or over the phone, both having an equal chance of selection.

Every individual who logs on or calls to enter, whether they are chosen to play on the air live or not, is entered into a "Weekly Prize Bonanza" drawing for which a single prize is awarded once a week.  Prizes in the first three weeks included a vacation package, diamond watches, and a cruise. (Currently, the prize is awarded monthly.) In addition, all contestants who play on-air are currently awarded 2,500 "Oodles," (5,000 on "Winner Wednesday" shows) an online currency offered to GSN website users.

At the beginning of March, the show introduced another way home viewers can win called "Steal These Wheels". All contestants chosen to play live on the air were entered into a drawing for a new Chrysler PT Cruiser, which was awarded on the first day of April. Generally, during the final segment of the show, the hosts presented three keys with labels showing the first names and towns of that day's players, then placed them into a glass tumbler, referred to as a "hopper". The hosts had a running gag that the car was parked in host Fred Roggin's parking spot, thus making the spot unavailable for his own car.

On April 1, 2008, a name was pulled from the hopper, and the PT Cruiser was awarded to a male contestant living in Woodstock, Illinois. Host Heidi Bohay then surprised viewers by announcing that "Steal These Wheels" would continue for a second month, with a Jeep Patriot being the prize.

During the final week of March, regular host Fred Roggin took a one-week vacation. In his absence, game show legend and celebrity emcee Wink Martindale took his place.  Regularly, throughout the week, Martindale made jokes centering on Roggin's absence, such as finding a wallet full of cash tucked inside the host chair and revealing to the audience that Fred was not on vacation, but was, in fact, on the run from the police.  While Fred was in Beijing, China for NBC's Olympic coverage, several hosts filled in, including Martindale, Alfonso Ribeiro, Ty Treadway and Bob Goen .

The hosts have increasingly taken a light-hearted approach to the show's material, gently poking fun at the classic game shows on the GSN schedule and their sometimes anachronistic elements, the network itself, and each other.

Hosts
 Bob Guiney (June 2009 – July 2011)
 Annie Duke (July 2009 – May 2011)
 Todd Newton (June 2009 – May 2011)
 Jai Rodriguez (April 2009 – May 2011)
 Heidi Bohay (February 2008 – April 2010)
 Fred Roggin (February 2008 – July 2009)
 Kelly Packard (September 2008 – November 2008)
 Alfonso Ribeiro (September 2008 – August 2009)
 Debra Wilson (May 2009 – January 2010)

Celebrity guests
 Bob Guiney, former participant on The Bachelor; March 1, 2008; June 2009 – July 2011
 Wink Martindale, Tic-Tac-Dough host; February 29, 2008; March 24–28, 2008; May 19–21, 2008; July 28 – August 1, 2008 (substitute host for Fred)
 Patti Deutsch, Match Game panelist; March 7, 2008
 Monty Hall, Let's Make a Deal host; March 14, 2008
 Ken Jennings, record-winning Jeopardy! champion; March 19, 2008 and October 10, 2008
 Joyce Bulifant, Match Game panelist; March 21, 2008
 Peter Marshall, Hollywood Squares host; March 28, 2008
 Bob Eubanks, The Newlywed Game host; April 4, 2008 and May 18, 2010
 Marcia Wallace, Match Game panelist; April 11, 2008
 Pat Sajak, Wheel of Fortune host; April 17, 2008
 Bart Braverman, Match Game panelist; April 18, 2008
 Phyllis Diller, actress; April 25, 2008
 Rich Fields, The Price Is Right announcer; May 1, 2008
 Bill Rafferty, Blockbusters, Card Sharks host; May 2, 2008
 Donna Mills, actress; May 6, 2008
 Todd Newton, Whammy! The All-New Press Your Luck host; May 9, 2008, June 2–3, 2009 (Co-host with Fred/Heidi)
 Geoff Edwards, Jackpot, Treasure Hunt host; May 16, 2008
 Charo, Hollywood Squares panelist; May 23, 2008
 Tom Kennedy, Password Plus host; May 30, 2008
 Gary Owens, The Gong Show host and veteran voice-over artist; June 2, 2008
 Rip Taylor, The $1.98 Beauty Show host; June 3, 2008 and July 4, 2008
 Jay Johnson, ventriloquist; June 6, 2008
 Vince Van Patten, World Poker Tour host; June 13, 2008
 Dick Van Patten, actor; June 13, 2008
 Jim Lange, The Dating Game host; June 20, 2008
 Melissa Rivers, TV personality; June 27, 2008; (February 5–6, 2009 & March 25–26, 2009 - Co-Host with Fred)
 Corbin Bernsen, How Much Is Enough? host; July 9, 2008
 Pat Harrington, actor; July 11, 2008
 Adam West, actor; July 16, 2008
 Alfonso Ribeiro, Catch 21 host; July 18, 2008; August 4–8, 2008 (substitute host for Fred); September 15, 2008 – August 11, 2009 (permanent co-host)
 Lee Meriwether, actress, Miss America 1955; July 25, 2008
 Bill Daily, Match Game panelist; August 1, 2008
 Bob Goen, That's the Question host; August 11–15, 2008 (substitute host for Fred)
 Marianne Curan, GSN Radio host (and wife of Bob Goen) August 2008
 Charlene Tilton, actress; August 15, 2008
 Ty Treadway, Merv Griffin's Crosswords host; August 18, 2008 – August 22, 2008 (substitute host for Fred)
 Jimmie Walker, Match Game panelist; August 22, 2008
 Bil Dwyer, Extreme Dodgeball and I've Got a Secret host; August 25, 2008 – August 26, 2008 (substitute host for Fred)
 Chuck Woolery, Love Connection, Lingo, Scrabble host; August 27, 2008
 Dawn Wells, actress, September 5, 2008
 Barry Williams, actor The Brady Bunch, September 12, 2008 (postponed from August 8, 2008)
 Joey Fatone, actor, former 'N Sync member, host of American version and Australian version of the game show The Singing Bee; September 18, 2008
 Jerry Springer, talk show host, September 19, 2008
 Orson Bean, actor, September 26, 2008
 John Davidson, Hollywood Squares, The $100,000 Pyramid, Time Machine host, October 3, 2008
 Loretta Swit, actress and Match Game panelist, October 10, 2008
 Richard Karn, Bingo America host, October 22, 2008; (December 19, 2008 –  Co-Host for a day with Fred) May 15, 2009
 Vanna White, Letter Turner on Wheel of Fortune, October 30, 2008
 Ali Landry, actress and model, November 6, 2008
 Shirley Jones, actress, November 7, 2008
 Tom Green, Canadian actor, November 13, 2008
 Susan Olsen, Actress, November 14, 2008; (January 2, 2009 –  Co-Host for a day with Alfonso); (February 9, 2009 –  Co-host for a day with Fred)
 Kate Flannery, Actress The Office, November 19, 2008; (January 29, 2009 –  Co-Host for a day with Fred)
 Betty White, actress and Match Game panelist, November 20, 2008
 Alan Thicke, Canadian Actor, November 21, 2008
 Eric Wilkerson, GSN network director operations, December 1, 2008 (14th anniversary celebration on GSN)
 Tracey Gold, actress, December 4, 2008, and January 12–16, 2009 (Co-Host with Fred), February 16–20, 2009; March 30–31, 2009; April 1–2, 2009 (Co-Host with Fred)
 George Gray, Weakest Link host, December 4, 2008
 James Avery, Actor, December 5, 2008
 Tatyana Ali, actress and singer, December 5, 2008; (December 30, 2008 –  Co-Host for a day with Alfonso)
 Cindy Williams, actress, December 5, 2008 (Co-Host for a day with Fred)
 Mark L. Walberg, actor, December 8, 2008; (December 22, 2008 –  Substitute host for Fred); (February 10–11, 2009 - Co-host with Fred); April 23, 2009 (Substitute host for Alfonso)
 Carnie Wilson, Singer, December 9, 2008, and January 5–6, 2009, January 26–28, 2009 & April 7–8, 2009 (Co-Host with Fred); April 3, 2009 (Co-host with Alfonso); April 6, 2009.
 Telma Hopkins, actress and singer, December 10, 2008 (Co-Host for a day with Fred)
 Rachel Quaintance, actress, December 11, 2008 & March 9–10, 2009 (Co-Host with Fred)
 Donny Osmond, actor and game show host, December 15, 2008 (Phone Call)
 Connie Sellecca, actress, December 15, 2008
 Kim Coles, actress, December 16, 2008 & March 17–20, 2009 (Co-Host with Fred)
 Catherine Hicks, actress, December 18, 2008 (Co-Host for a day with Fred)
 Mikki Padilla, Catch 21 Card Dealer, December 23, 2008 (Co-Host for a day with Alfonso); (March 23–24, 2009 - Substitute host for Heidi)
 Sienna Ribeiro, Alfonso's daughter, December 29–30, 2008, January 2, 2009, and February 23, 2009, April 8, 2009.
 Karyn Parsons, actress, December 29, 2008 (Co-host for a day with Alfonso)
 Joy Ribeiro, Alfonso's mom, January 2, 2009
 Karen Valentine, actress, January 9, 2009, and February 2–4, 2009 (Co-host with Fred)
 Julie Moran, former correspondent on Entertainment Tonight, January 19–23, 2009 (Co-host with Fred)
 Michael Olsen, son of The Brady Bunch actress Susan Olsen, February 9, 2009
 Dave Coulier, actor Full House, America's Funniest People, February 23–24, 2009 & May 11–12, 2009 (Co-host with Fred)
 Maureen McCormick, actress The Brady Bunch, February 26–27, 2009 (Co-host with Fred)
 Charlie Landry, President of Eggland's Best egg company, February 26, 2009
 Mackenzie Phillips, actress, March 2–4, 2009 (Co-host with Fred)
 Christopher Lowell, interior decorator, March 12, 2009
 Julie Brown, actress, March 12–13, 2009 & April 24, 2009 (Co-host with Fred/Alfonso/Heidi)
 Michael Ribeiro, Alfonso's dad, March 30, 2009
 Gabriel Spound, one of Heidi's sons, April 8, 2009
 John Salley, retired NBA player, April 9, 2009 (Co-host with Fred)
 Loni Love, actress and comedian, April 13, 2009 & April 24, 2009 (Co-host with Alfonso/Heidi)
 Alison Sweeney, actress, April 14, 2009 (Via Skype)
 Suzanne Whang, actress, April 14, 2009 (Co-host with Alfonso); April 28, 2009 and May 12, 2009 (Substitute host for Alfonso); May 12, 2009 (Co-Host with Fred)
 Mike Siegel, radio talk show host, April 15, 2009, and April 28, 2009 (Substitute host for Fred/Alfonso)
 Teri Garr, actress, April 16, 2009 (Via Skype)
 Bo Griffin, Extra correspondent, April 16–17 & April 30, 2009 (Substitute host for Fred/Co-host with Heidi); May 1, 2009 (Co-host with Fred)
 Annie Duke, professional poker player, April 27, 2009, and May 26, 2009 (Co-host with Alfonso/Heidi)
 Jai Rodriguez, host of Animal Planet show Groomer Has It, April 29–30, 2009 & May 14, 2009 (Co-host with Heidi/Fred) June 8, 2009 (Co-host with Heidi/Debra), June 9, 2009 (Co-host with Heidi/Alfonso)
 Christian Hagen, May 4, 2009 (Substitute host for Alfonso)
 Debra Wilson, actress, May 4, 2009 (Co-host with Fred); May 13, 2009 & May 15, 2009 (Substitute host for Alfonso); May 26, 2009 – January 2010 (permanent co-host)
 Paul Willson, actor, May 5, 2009
 Travis Eller, stage manager on GSN Live, May 5, 2009
 Patricia Lopez, Reporter, May 6–7, 2009 (Co-host with Fred), July 23–24, 2009 (substitute host for Alfonso/Todd)
 Tara McNamara, country music VJ, May 13, 2009 (Co-host with Fred)
 Marc Istook, TV Guide Person, May 14, 2009 (Co-host with Heidi)
 Carol Merrill, model on Let's Make a Deal, May 14, 2009 (Co-host with Fred)
 Tony Cowell, brother of Simon Cowell, June 4, 2009 (Co-host with Heidi)
 Ross Mathews, correspondent for Jay Leno, June 10, 2009 (Co-host with Heidi/Alfonso)
 Ant, comedian and host of Celebrity Fit Club October 22, 2009 (via Skype)
 Betty White, April 13, 2010
 Jerry Springer, host of Baggage, April 30, 2010
 Shandi Finnessey, Miss USA 2004, Lingo co-host, August 23, 2010
 Jeff Sutphen, Reporter/Field Host, 2009-2010
 Alex Cambert, September 3, 2010 (Substitute host for Bob)
 Ian Stich, first winner of Think Like a Cat, November 2008
 Jacob Snowberger, winner of Cleveland GSN Live host tryouts, April 20, 2009 (Co-host with Fred)
 Jeni Mugler, winner of St. Louis GSN Live host tryouts, April 21, 2009 (Co-host with Fred)
 Jason Antoniewicz, winner of Detroit GSN Live host tryouts, April 22, 2009 (Co-host with Fred)
 Danielle Williams, winner of Phoenix GSN Live tryouts, April 23, 2009 (Co-host with Fred)
 Adam Wurtzel, winner of Philadelphia GSN Live tryouts and CBS's The Early Show Audience Warm Up/Plaza Producer/Backstage Correspondent, April 24, 2009, (Co-host with Fred)
 Thomas White, winner of Houston GSN Live tryouts, April 27, 2009, (Co-host with Fred)
 Josh Yawn, winner of Sacramento GSN Live tryouts, April 28, 2009, (Co-host with Fred)

Partial list of GSN Live games
 TV Time - Viewers are given clues to a television show that premiered in a particular year and must identify the show and/or actors involved in the show.
 Bridge to the Stars - Viewers are given the first name of one celebrity and the last name of a second celebrity and must come up with the name that "bridges" the two celebrity names together.
 Same Name Game - Viewers are given three first names of celebrities who share a common last name, or three last names of celebrities who share a common first name.  The job of the viewer is to provide the missing name.
 Winning Signs - Viewers are given astrological clues to the identity of a celebrity and must come up with the name of the celebrity in order to win.
 Spies on the Prize - Viewers are asked questions about famous spies and spy movies.
 Put Me In, Coach! - Questions are all about famous sports-themed movies.
 Next in Line - Viewers are asked to solve puzzles about someone or something that is famous for being "next" to something else in pop culture.
 Ride 'em Cowboy! - Questions are about famous cowboys and Western films and television shows.
 Classic Recall Challenge - For the game, viewers must watch GSN Live's classic game show line-up for a particular day, and then answer questions about things that happened during the particular show.  This game was played during the premiere episode of GSN Live and has remained in high-rotation ever since.
 All My TV Children - Viewers are asked to identify the names of famous TV children or the actors/actresses who played them.
 Charles Nelson Reilly Scratchers - A cleverly designed "scratcher" card featuring Match Game regular Charles Nelson Reilly has four hidden prizes.  Viewers are allowed to "scratch off" one of the spaces to see what prize they will be playing for, then must answer a general pop-culture question correctly in order to win
 Take My Wife, Cheese! - Viewers are asked questions about famous wives in pop culture.  The title refers to the fact that the game is only played in association with hours of GSN Live sponsored by Cheez-It snack crackers.
 What's My Fishing Line? - Questions are all about TV or film characters whose careers have something to do with water.  This was the very first game ever played on GSN Live.
 Double Duty - Questions are about TV or movie characters that were played by more than one actor.
 What's In Fred's Wallet - 4 grocery items are put on the counter and the caller has to guess which 2 are less than what Fred has in his wallet. i.e. If Fred has $5.00 in his wallet, The caller has to guess which 2 grocery items are less than $5.00 to get the prize.
 How-D - Questions with answers starting with the letter "D."
 Alphabet Soup - A Famous name is scrambled and put in a bowl of alphabet soup and the caller has to try to unscramble the letters, using the clue given to them.
 This Day In History - Questions about famous events that happened back then.
 What's In A Word - The caller has to try to guess the answer to the question asked by finding it in the word given to them.
 Mega Mix - The caller has to try to find the answer hidden in the puzzle with the clue given to them.
 Tip Top Shape - Question about Actors/Actresses who got in Tip Top Shape for a role.
 Magic Number - Caller picks a letter of A,B,C,D each one has a number and the caller has to pick three hats from the board without going over the number they picked i.e. if they pick 20, of the three numbers they pick. If they get that exact amount or less they win all three prizes, If they exceed the number they still get a consolation prize. In the revived version, a spin of a wheel determines the "magic number," and the caller is shown three prizes of increasing value. For each hat the caller picks, they are upgraded to the next higher-valued prize; if the caller reaches the "magic number" exactly, they win all three prizes. The caller can stop with the prize they have, but if they exceed the "magic number," they lose the prize they had.
 Red Rover Red Rover - Questions about famous dogs.
 I Got The Blues - Questions about songs with the word "Blue" in the title.
 Cheezy Come Cheezy Go - Questions about Celebrities who had great success but then lost it.
 Get Real - Questions about reality Television.
 Go Ask Alice - Questions about Famous People named "Alice."
 Ask Around - Questions about things that are "Circular."
 Ask The Mask - Questions about Famous "Mask Wearers."
 Ask The Magic Mirror - Questions about Famous Fairy Tales.
 I'm Stuffed - Questions about famous toys and dolls.
 Singing In The Shower - Questions about famous singers.
 Cup Of Joe - Questions about famous people named "Joe."
 Freddy The 13th - Viewers are shown a picture of a famous "Fred" around the age of 13, they are given a clue and they have to try to identify which famous Fred it is.
 Hit The Showers - Questions about famous athletes.
 That's An Order - Viewers are given four items and they must put them in a certain order.
 In the Chips - 12 Poker Chips are placed on the screen, and behind 7 of them there are dollar amounts ranging from $25 to $250; the other 5 are strikes.  The viewer selects chips one at a time in the hope of finding money amounts. Once the player finds two strikes they have the option to quit the game; if they find three strikes they lose all of the money they had accumulated. The game is often played under other names and themes. An occasionally used variant called "The Color of Cash" is also played; in this variant, the viewer selects from a board of 9 spaces (three have $25, three have $50, and three have either $75 or $100). In this variant, the game ends when the player finds three of the same money amount, however, the player keeps all of the money they uncover. Like "In the Chips," "The Color of Cash" is also played under other names and themes.
 King of the Mountain - Two contestants, one a returning champion, compete. The champion selects a category from a choice of three, and is asked five questions in that category, which they must answer as fast as they can; a clock counts up from 0.0 and stops once the champion has attempted all five questions. The challenger then selects one of the other two categories, and is also asked five questions, while the clock runs back down to zero. To win, the challenger must match the champion's score in a faster time, otherwise, the champion wins. The winner receives $250 (originally $500) and plays again the next time. Originally also, a contestant who won five games won a motor scooter as a bonus prize. The game was retired on December 29, 2010, after a contestant named Zach Horan won all 20 games played between February 24, 2010, and December 29, 2010, winning $5250.
 Double Word Score - The contestant is shown a five or six-letter word, and is allowed 45 seconds to make as many words (must be at least three letters in length) from the letters of that word as he or she can. The player must state the word, and then spell it. Each word is worth $25. In addition, there is at least one other five or six-letter word that can be made from all the letters of the base word; for each word the contestant makes using all the letters in the base word, they win a further $100.
 Time Capsule - The contestant is asked up to 10 questions relating to a previous year. The contestant has 60 seconds to answer as many of the questions as possible at $25 per question.
 Win or Wonk - Three objects are presented to the contestant. One of the objects has a medium-sized prize attached to it, another corresponds to a grand prize, and the third has a worthless prize (the "Wonk" prize). The contestant selects one of the objects. Before playing out the game, the host reveals the location of the medium prize and offers the contestant that prize to quit out. (If the contestant selected the medium prize initially, they can give it up to select again.) If the contestant plays on, he or she wins the prize, good or bad, attached to the selected object. This game is often played under other names and themes; when played for cash, the amounts are usually either $50 and $150 or $100 and $250. One variant, played under the name "Golden Ticket," had the player selecting numbers to find two halves of a prize; the grand prize was printed on a "golden ticket," the medium-sized prize on a "silver ticket", and the "Wonk" prize on a "bronze ticket." In this variant, once the player has found one half of the "Wonk" prize, they have the option of accepting a smaller prize (usually offered on the first question in other games) as a buy-out.
 Zig Zag - The contestant is given one free Zig Zag chip and asked two questions on a specific subject. For each correct answer, the player is given another Zig Zag chip. After the questions, an assistant drops the chips one at a time down a peg-filled board, similar to the game Plinko on The Price Is Right; the contestant is allowed to select the starting position of each chip. The contestant wins the amount of money that each chip lands in, either $50, $75, or $150; a contestant is thus guaranteed to win at least $50, but can win as much as $450.
 Cash Carousel - The contestant is given one selection from among six on-screen horses, and can win two more selections by answering questions. After the questions, the contestant selects their horses, and wins the money behind each of the horses they pick. Each horse hides a money amount from $25 to $250.
 A Match Made In Hollywood - Viewers answer questions about celebrity couples, winning money or prizes for correct answers.

Stump the Master
A new feature called "Stump the Master" was introduced to the show. On the Friday programs, Ken Jennings, former Jeopardy! champion, is pitted against home viewers. Viewers submit their questions via GSN.com, and if they can stump Jennings, they win $1,000. For the first few shows, Ken came to the studio in person and sat on a stool with his back facing the categories. On one show he was called and answered the question over the telephone for the show. Currently, Ken appears via video phone, sponsored by Skype. If the question is answered correctly by Jennings, $1,000 is added to the jackpot until he is beaten. Regardless, the viewer who sent in that question receives a consolation prize. The first game of Stump the Master was played on October 31, 2008   So far, the highest amount of money won on Stump the Master is $9,000. As of August 24, 2009, this game is now defunct. It can be said that it was replaced by "Clued In."

Quick Wits
A new feature called "Quick Wits" was introduced during the second half of GSN Live. Multiple callers are standing by live, while Fred/Todd/Alfonso asks a trivia question to home viewers to compete for cash and prizes. If the caller is incorrect or runs out of time, they'll move on to the next caller, who then attempts the same question; when a question is answered correctly, the next caller is given a new question. The game continues until there are no more callers; usually, six people are called. Currently, Bob spins a wheel to determine the prize (or, on Monday shows, the cash amount; when played for cash, the wheel has three $50 spaces, two $75 spaces, two $100 spaces, and one $250 space) to be played for.

Money Meter
On May 26, 2009, a new feature called "Money Meter" was introduced at the end of GSN Live, the same day the current set was introduced. The Jackpot starts at $500, the Money Meter Jackpot increased every time the games were played when the players are online at GSN.com and logging-on from their personal account at GSN.com. When a caller is chosen to play Money Meter, a question is asked by the host. Once after the host finishes asking a question and the multiple-choice answers, a caller has five seconds to answer the question. If a caller is wrong or run out of time, the money meter stays for the next three hours (six hours until October 9, 2009) of GSN Live the next day. If a caller answers the Money Meter question correctly, the caller will win the Money Meter Jackpot, and the Money Meter restarts again to $500. In 2010, this was changed to the "Weekly Money Meter" where the Jackpot is built throughout the week and the question is asked at the end of Friday's show. By April 2010, however, the Weekly Money Meter was gone.

Clued In
On July 27, 2009, a new feature called "Clued In" was introduced during the second half of GSN Live. Home viewers watched daily and logged on to GSN.com/Live to face former Jeopardy! champion Ken Jennings to catch the clue of the day. Every week, Ken shows the clue of the day and the clues are connected to come up with an answer. Whoever misses it will be posted on the Facebook page, and the next clue will be revealed by Ken the next day from Monday through Thursday. On Friday, up to three callers will play with Ken for $1,000 cash. Like the Money Meter, this was also gone by April 2010.

GSN Live After Hours
In March 2010, a new feature called "GSN Live After Hours" is introduced at the beginning of the show. Every weekday and weekend from 6:00 pm through 2:30 pm, players can enter by phone number online 10 times each hour. When a caller is chosen, the host will spin the wheel and see how much money the caller will be playing for. Questions can be worth $100, $250, $500, and $1,000, each with two spaces; the money amount also determines the difficulty of the question. After the wheel stops, Bob will read the question assigned to that space, along with four multiple-choice answers. Once Bob finishes reading the question and the multiple-choice answers, a caller has five seconds to answer the question; the first answer must be accepted. If the caller is right, they win the amount spun on the wheel. Each time a $1,000 question is asked and missed, one of the lowest remaining money amounts (starting with a $100 space) is removed from the wheel and replaced with a $1,000 space until the $1,000 is won; in this way, once six $1,000 questions are asked and missed, all further attempts at the game are worth $1,000 until someone wins. If an inability to generate a winner persists for several more days, an "Instant Winner" space replaces one of the $1,000 spaces; if the "Instant Winner" space is landed on, the contestant wins the $1,000 immediately. More recently, an "Instant Winner" space begins replacing $1,000 spaces starting with the last $500 space, and another is added to the wheel for each failure.

Repeats
On September 1, 2008—Labor Day—GSN aired clips from the "best" of the series. As a result, the show was not live that day.

References

 "GSN Rewards Viewers With New Opportunities to Win With 'GSN LIVE,' Weekdays Beginning Monday, February 25"

External links
 Official website 
 Official rules 
 

Game Show Network original programming
Phone-in quiz shows
American live television series
2008 American television series debuts
2011 American television series endings